Uberabasuchus ("Uberaba crocodile") is an extinct genus of crocodylomorph from the Late Cretaceous Serra da Galga Formation of Brazil. Thus, rather than slicing flesh and blood vessels, it is likely to have inflicted powerful crushing bites (same is likely for Lomasuchus and Peirosaurus). The post-crania and the geology suggesting an arid climate indicate that Uberabasuchus was likely a terrestrial predator.

References

Further reading 
 Uberabasuchus terrificus sp. nov., a New Crocodylomorpha from the Bauru Basin (Upper Cretaceous), Brazil - original description of genus (pdf)

Peirosaurids
Terrestrial crocodylomorphs
Campanian life
Maastrichtian life
Late Cretaceous crocodylomorphs of South America
Cretaceous Brazil
Fossils of Brazil
Marília Formation
Fossil taxa described in 2004
Prehistoric pseudosuchian genera